Sansanee Changkasiri (born 29 April 1962) is a Thai former swimmer. She competed in three events at the 1976 Summer Olympics.

References

1962 births
Living people
Sansanee Changkasiri
Sansanee Changkasiri
Swimmers at the 1976 Summer Olympics
Place of birth missing (living people)
Southeast Asian Games medalists in swimming
Sansanee Changkasiri
Sansanee Changkasiri
Swimmers at the 1974 Asian Games
Swimmers at the 1978 Asian Games
Medalists at the 1978 Asian Games
Asian Games medalists in swimming
Sansanee Changkasiri
Competitors at the 1973 Southeast Asian Peninsular Games
Competitors at the 1975 Southeast Asian Peninsular Games
Sansanee Changkasiri